Benton School District is a public school district based in Benton, Arkansas, United States. The school district encompasses  of land, including portions of Saline County and Garland County serving communities such as most of Benton, a small slice of Salem CDP, Lonsdale, and Hot Springs National Park.

The district proves comprehensive education for more than 4,750 pre-kindergarten through grade 12 students while employing more than 500 faculty, administrators and staff. The district and its seven schools are accredited by the Arkansas Department of Education (ADE).

History
In 1979 the Rural Dale School District dissolved, with a portion going to the Benton district.

Schools 
 Secondary schools
 Benton High School, serving more than 950 students in grades 10 through 12.
 Benton Junior High School, serving more than 700 students in grades 8 and 9.
 Benton Middle School, serving more than 1150 students in grades 5, 6 and 7.
 Elementary schools 
 Angie Grant Elementary School, serving more than 550 students in prekindergarten through grade 4.
 Caldwell Ełementary School, serving more than 500 students in kindergarten through grade 4.
 Perrin Ełementary School, serving more than 600 students in prekindergarten through grade 4.
 Ringgold Ełementary School, serving more than 550 students in prekindergarten through grade 4.

References

Further reading
These include maps of predecessor districts:
 (Download)
 (Download)

External links 

 

School districts in Arkansas
Education in Garland County, Arkansas
Education in Saline County, Arkansas
Benton, Arkansas